Gerald K. Anderson (April 26, 1921 – November 3, 1995) was an American legislator who served in the Wisconsin State Assembly from 1965 to 1969.

Born in Waupaca, a small town in Wisconsin's Waupaca County, Gerald Anderson attended Waupaca elementary and high schools, with a subsequent B.A. degree from what is now the University of Wisconsin-Madison in 1942.  from 1942 to 1945, during World War II, he served in the United States Army and also, in 1943, studied at the University of Missouri.  Receiving his law degree (LL.B.) from the University of Wisconsin Law School, he became an attorney and, in 1964, district attorney of Waupaca County.  Later that year, he received the Republican nomination for a seat in the State Assembly and was elected in November, with appointment to Legislative Council Judiciary Committee.

References

People from Waupaca, Wisconsin
Republican Party members of the Wisconsin State Assembly
Wisconsin lawyers
Military personnel from Wisconsin
United States Army soldiers
United States Army personnel of World War II
University of Wisconsin–Madison alumni
University of Missouri alumni
University of Wisconsin Law School alumni
1921 births
1995 deaths
20th-century American lawyers
20th-century American politicians